Ballylinney or Ballylinny is a small village and townland near Ballyclare in County Antrim, Northern Ireland. It is part of Antrim and Newtownabbey Borough Council.

Schools 
The closest local school is called Thompson Primary School.

Churches 
Ballylinney Presbyterian Church

See also
List of towns in Northern Ireland
List of villages in Northern Ireland

References

External links 
Ballylinney Church

Villages in County Antrim